Kingston Power Station was a coal-fired generating station on the Thames in Kingston upon Thames, Surrey (later Greater London). It ceased generating in 1980 and has been demolished.

History
The first station was built in 1893, with an original capacity of 225 kW. New generating equipment was added as the demand for electricity increased. The generating capacity, maximum load, and electricity generated and sold was as follows:

The A station eventually closed in 1959. A new 'B' station was planned before World War II, opening in 1948. The Thames was used both for coal supply and ash removal, and as a source of cooling water. The new station was the first to be opened following nationalisation of the power industry, with the official opening by King George VI, the first station to receive such an honour since Barking in 1924.

Technical specification
In 1923 the plant comprised two 1,250 kW turbo-alternators, these were supplied from the boiler plant which produced a total of 66,000 lb/hr (8.32 kg/s) of steam. Electricity was available at 3-phase AC, 50 Hz at 440, 415 & 240V and single phase AC, 77 Hz at 210 & 105V. In 1923 the station generated  3.448 GWh of electricity, some of this was used in the plant, the total amount sold was 1.888 GWh. The revenue from sales of current was £39,623, this gave a surplus of revenue over expenses of £21,124.

By 1966 Kingston B power station had 4 × 30 MW British Thomson-Houston turbo-alternators, giving a generating capacity of 123 MW. The chain grate stoker Stirling boilers had a steam capacity of 1,710,000 lb/hr (215.4 kg/s). The steam conditions at the turbine stop valve were 600 psi (41.4 bar) and 454 °C. The overall thermal efficiency of the station in 1966 was 21.12 per cent.

Electricity output from Kingston power station was as follows.

Kingston annual electricity output GWh.

Closure
Generation ceased on 27 October 1980 with a generating capacity of 117 megawatts. The station was eventually demolished, despite calls for preservation as a power museum. The two 250-foot chimneys were demolished in 1994.

See also

Canbury Gardens

References

Coal-fired power stations in England
Former coal-fired power stations in the United Kingdom
Former power stations in London
Demolished power stations in the United Kingdom
Demolished buildings and structures in London
Power stations on the River Thames
Former buildings and structures in the Royal Borough of Kingston upon Thames
1893 establishments in England
1980 disestablishments in England
Energy infrastructure completed in 1893
Energy infrastructure completed in 1948
Buildings and structures demolished in 1994